Cyrtogrammus lateripictus is a species of beetle in the family Cerambycidae. It was described by Gressitt in 1939. It is known from China, and possibly Sumatra.

References

Xylorhizini
Beetles described in 1939